Hobbs is a surname. Notable people with this surname include:

Albert Hobbs (1822–1897), New York politician
Anne Hobbs, English tennis player
Alfred Charles Hobbs, a famous lockpicker
Angie Hobbs, British philosopher
Becky Hobbs
Bill Hobbs (American football) (1946–2004), American football linebacker
Bill Hobbs (baseball) (1893–1945), American baseball shortstop
Bill Hobbs (rower) (1949–2020), American Olympic rower, brother of rower Franklin Hobbs
Braydon Hobbs, American basketball player
Brian Kenneth Hobbs, medical doctor in South Australia
Bruce Hobbs
Cathy Hobbs
Carleton Hobbs
Chelsea Hobbs
Dara Hobbs, American operatic soprano
David Hobbs (racing driver), British former racing driver
David Hobbs (basketball), American basketball coach
David Hobbs (rugby league), rugby league player
Eddie Hobbs, Irish celebrity accountant
Ellis Hobbs
Franklin Hobbs (born 1947), American Olympic rower, brother of rower Bill Hobbs
Frederick Hobbs (disambiguation), multiple people
Fredric Hobbs, an American experimental filmmaker
Horton H. Hobbs Jr. (1914–1994), American taxonomist and carcinologist
Howard Hobbs
Jack Hobbs, English cricketer
Jack Hobbs (footballer)
Jerry Hobbs
Jock Hobbs
John Nelson Hobbs (1923–1990), British-Australian career police officer and amateur ornithologist
John Raymond Hobbs (1929–2008), English professor of medicine
Karl Hobbs
Lucy Hobbs Taylor (1833–1910), first American woman to graduate from dental school
Luke Hobbs, character in The Fast and the Furious
Marian Hobbs
Mary Anne Hobbs
Nate Hobbs (born 1999), American football player
Peter Hobbs (disambiguation), multiple people
Randy Jo Hobbs
Renee Hobbs
Robin Hobbs
Roger Hobbs
Sam Hobbs, American politician
Sarah Hobbs, American artist
Steve Hobbs (disambiguation)
Talbot Hobbs
William Hobbs (disambiguation), multiple people

See also
Hobbes (disambiguation)

Surnames
English-language surnames
Patronymic surnames
Surnames from given names